The Decoration of the Cross of Queen Elisabeth was a Decoration established by Prince Carol I of Romania by Royal Decree 2270 on 6 October 1878 for his wife, Princess Elisabeth of Wied, to award Romanian women she deemed to have achieved outstanding service for caring for the wounded and sick, whether directly in ambulances and hospital campaigns, or indirectly through donations or other actions.

The Decoration was abolished during the abolishment of the Romanian Monarchy in 1947 and wasn't reinstated as a Dynastic Decoration of the Decorations of the Romanian Royal House by Former King Michael I.

References

Orders, decorations, and medals of Romania